Kathryn Jane Jeffery (born 5 March 1962) is a neuroscientist from New Zealand. She is a professor of behavioural neuroscience at University College London. She studies how the brain encodes three-dimensional space and its role in navigation.

Early life and career 
Jeffery grew up in Dunedin, New Zealand, the daughter of an orthopaedic surgeon and operating theatre nurse. She went to S. Hilda's Collegiate School for girls and then attended Otago University Medical School, spending clinical training years in Christchurch. She met Jim Donnett during her time in Edinburgh. They moved to London together when she began her postdoctoral work. They were married in 1993 and later had three daughters, in 1994, 1997 and 2002.

Jeffery graduated with a degree of MB ChB from the University of Otago in 1985. After working as a house officer, she returned to the University of Otago to complete a master's degree in 1989 under the supervision of Cliff Abraham. She completed her PhD at the University of Edinburgh in 1993 under the supervision of Richard Morris. She went on to work as a postdoctoral researcher with John O'Keefe, who won the 2014 Nobel Prize for his work on place cells, at University College London. Jeffery correctly predicted he would win the Nobel Prize in a tweet. During this time she met May-Britt Moser and Edvard Moser who visited the lab for several months. Donnett sold them a newly designed recording system, this being the first sale from the company Axona Ltd he founded with Jeffery and which they still direct. This recording system later became the one with which the Mosers discovered grid cells, and now resides in the Nobel Prize Museum in Stockholm.

Jeffery stayed at University College London to become a lecturer and later a professor. Here, she founded the Institute of Behavioural Neuroscience, of which she is also director.

She was also head of department for Experimental Psychology (which back then was called Cognitive, Perceptual and Brain Sciences) at University College London from 2010 to 2013.

Research 
Jeffery is particularly interested in the representation of 3D space within the hippocampal system in our brain. The hippocampus contains place cells, discovered by O’Keefe in 1971, and her work has focused on the question of how a place cell “knows” when to become active. A long running thread has been how the brain integrates static information from environmental landmarks and dynamic information arising from movement through space.

A second interest has been in how the brain uses “context” to help determine which environment the animal is in. More recent work has addressed the issue of whether the internal map extends upwards as well as across horizontal space (in other words, whether it is three-dimensional). Jeffery's original proposal in 2011 was that the map is essentially “flat” (2-D), with relatively little sensitivity to upwards movement, but more recent work has modulated that view as it seems that in some types of environment the place-cell map can be 3-D.

Jeffery also studies head direction cells, cells in the brain that represent the direction an animal is facing.

Science and art 
Jeffery has been involved in a number of projects linking neuroscience and art. She collaborated on the piece Spin Glass with Jenny Walsh and Jeremy Keenan, which represents the head direction network in the brain of an animal. She consulted on the Off-Broadway play The Nature of Forgetting, about how the brain represents memory.

Jeffery is also interested in the link between architecture and the representation of location in the brain. She presented at the Conscious Cities conferences on how the design of environments affects the sense of direction.

Environmental activism 
Jeffery is a member of Extinction Rebellion, a climate emergency group. She helped write their “Heading for Extinction” talk which explains the science of the climate and ecological emergency and is given by volunteers all around the country. She has spoken at Extinction Rebellion events on the science behind the climate emergency. She also co-founded the “Scientists for XR” subgroup and manage the website.

Honours 
Jeffery is a Fellow of the Royal Society of Biology and Fellow of the Royal Institute of Navigation. She is also a vice-president for the Royal Institute of Navigation.

Selected publications

References 

1962 births
Living people
New Zealand neuroscientists
New Zealand women neuroscientists
Academics of University College London
University of Otago alumni
Alumni of the University of Edinburgh
Fellows of the Royal Society of Biology